Roger Stephen Crisp (born 23 March 1961) is fellow and tutor in philosophy at St. Anne's College, Oxford.  He holds the university posts of Professor of Moral Philosophy and Uehiro Fellow and Tutor in Philosophy.  His work falls principally within the field of ethics, in particular metaethics, normative ethics, and applied ethics.  In addition, he is chairman of the Management Committee of the Oxford Uehiro Centre for Practical Ethics.

Education

Originally from Brentwood, Essex, Crisp began his higher education at St. Anne's College, Oxford in 1979, where he read Literae Humaniores.  He was amongst the first male cohort to study at this previously all-female college.  He was taught by, amongst others, Margaret Howatson, Gabriele Taylor, Iris Murdoch, and Peter Derow.  In 1983 he commenced the B.Phil., and from 1985 until 1988 he worked on his D.Phil., writing his thesis on utilitarianism.

Career
In 1986 Crisp began his first academic post, as a junior lecturer in philosophy at Magdalen College, Oxford; he returned to St Anne's for two years beginning in 1987 as a lecturer in philosophy, before taking up a lecturing post at Hertford College in 1988–1989. In 1989–1991 he moved to University College, as a British Academy Research Fellow and Honorary Junior Research Fellow. In 1991 he returned to St Anne's to take up a permanent post as Fellow and Tutor in Philosophy, succeeding Gabriele Taylor. For the first time in his career, Crisp temporarily left Oxford and spent the academic year 2010–2011 at Boston University to explore his interest in the moral philosophy of Henry Sidgwick.

Arguably Crisp's most significant work to date is Reasons and the Good (2006), in which he advances some novel approaches to the oldest questions in ethics. The central thesis of this work is that a fundamental issue in normative ethics is what ultimate reasons might underlie our actions; Crisp argues that the best exposition of such reasons will not employ moral concepts.

Other major works include a translation of Aristotle's Nicomachean Ethics, and the Routledge Guidebook to Mill on Utilitarianism. He was editor of the Oxford Handbook of the History of Ethics (2013).

Personal life 
Crisp is married with two daughters; Elizabeth and Harriet.  Aside from his work, his interests include bluegrass guitar and wine tasting.

Select publications 
This is a selection of Crisp's recent publications.  For an exhaustive list download the PDF file on his page on the Oxford University Philosophy Faculty website.

Books

Edited books

Chapters in books

Journal articles

Podcast

Conference papers

References

External links 
Roger Crisp's page on the St. Anne's College website
Roger Crisp's page on the Oxford University Philosophy Faculty website
"Philosophy bites": a website where contemporary philosophers deliver podcasts on philosophical topics
Roger Crisp's posts on an Oxford University practical ethics website

1961 births
20th-century British non-fiction writers
20th-century British philosophers
20th-century essayists
21st-century British non-fiction writers
21st-century British philosophers
21st-century essayists
Alumni of St Anne's College, Oxford
Analytic philosophers
British ethicists
British male essayists
Fellows of St Anne's College, Oxford
Fellows of University College, Oxford
Living people
Philosophers of education
Philosophy academics
Philosophy writers